Plasmodium lagopi is a parasite of the genus Plasmodium.

Like all Plasmodium species P. lagopi has both vertebrate and insect hosts. The vertebrate hosts for this parasite are birds.

Description 

The parasite was first described by Oliger in 1956.

Vectors

Not known.

References 

lagopi